Celerity BBS was a descendant of the freely distributed source of TCS BBS 1.43, and ultimately nearly completely rewritten.

Origin
It originally began as a project of Brendon Woirhaye (The Byter) and David Hicks (Moebius) in 1990 to quickly modify an existing BBS package to meet a simple organizational need (separate conferences for IBM PC users and Amiga users), and to meet the needs of high speed (9600 bit/s) communication, as most BBSes of the time could not pump data to the modem quickly enough.  The I/O and display subsystems were rewritten, and the BBS package got its name.

Use
It wasn't long before others became interested in the BBS software, and it went on to have over 500 authorized BBSes and about three times that number using it in an unauthorized manner.  It was very popular in the underground pirate, hacking, and phreaking community as well as with legitimate systems, including church BBSes, non profit group BBSes, many shareware distribution systems, and a governmental BBS in Portugal.

Features
Celerity BBS Version 2.04 boasts some of the following features:

(> Enhanced multitasking support including:
   (> Intelligent time slicing for Windows 3.x, Windows 95, OS/2, and
      DesqView environments to improve background / multinode performance
   (> Inter-node messages can be sent from any BBS prompt to other users
   (> Support for the DigiBoard multi-port communications boards
   (> Enhanced file locking for data protection on multinode BBSes

(> Full featured message section featuring:
   (> Multi-generational and cross-generational message threading
   (> File attachments to messages
   (> Message uploading/importing from a text/ANSI/graphic file
   (> Message downloading/exporting to a text/ANSI/graphic file
   (> Virtually unlimited message size limit (2,000,000,000+ bytes)
   (> QWK offline reader support built-in

(> Extensive conference management system featuring:
   (> Genuine hierarchal structure with unlimited depth
   (> An unlimited number of conference items may be defined
   (> Conference items may include:
      (> Message bases
      (> Transfer areas
      (> Online doors sections
      (> BBS lists
      (> Art galleries
      (> Voting booths
      (> Bulletin sections
      (> Sub-conferences
   (> Selective intelligent newscanning of entire conference trees
   (> Four basic conferences may be defined with an unlimited number of sub-
      conferences off these structures

(>  Enhanced file transfer section featuring:
   (> Up to 999 file areas per file section
   (> Unlimited number of file sections via the conference management system
   (> Up to 9999 files per file area
   (> Area-selectable file_id.diz / desc.sdi description importation
   (> Unlimited-length file descriptions
   (> Optional extended descriptions
   (> Repeated file checking which will selectively scan other areas
   (> Automatic integrity checking of ZIP/ARJ/LZH archives upon uploading
   (> Automatic ZIP/ARJ/LZH archive commenting
   (> Automatic ZIP/ARJ/LZH archive advertisement deletion
   (> Provision for virus scanning of ZIP/ARJ/LZH archives
   (> Support for external file transfer protocols including bidirectionals

(> Revolutionary CelerityText language file system featuring:
   (> Virtually unlimited size for each text entry
   (> Virtually all of the BBS text and formatting can be customized
   (> Intelligent indexing and text cache system to enhance display speed
   (> Support for multiple CelerityText files on a single BBS, allowing
      users to choose a motif of their preference
   (> Support for multiple CelerityText menu/prompt files on a single BBS to
      allow the user to choose a menu set that they like
   (> Built-in support for novice / intermediate / advanced / expert user
      help levels
   (> Over 75 CelerityText command directives providing access to user info,
      BBS statistics, context-sensitive details, and screen formatting

Celerity BBS had over 50 discrete releases between 1990 and 1995, and pioneered a number of new technologies which were not commonly seen, including split screen multiuser chat (8 node maximum), a file distribution network, an early "liveupdate" system where BBS updates were distributed, a cross BBS message board and email network (CelerityNet, adopted by some non-Celerity BBS programs), FIDONet support, offline (or off box) file upload processing, QWK offline reader support, the ability to completely change the look and feel of the system, new user application including new user committee voting, "geek speak" mode that transformed normal text to leet, and unlimited numbers of message and file conferences.  It supported multiple user interfaces designs in ASCII/ANSI/RIP and NAPLPS.  It supported multitasking under DesqView, Windows, and OS/2 environments.

Alacrity
Alacrity BBS was a premium version of Celerity BBS which was not broadly distributed.  Its most notable feature was an AI sysop chat which incorporated ELIZA-style logic, sprinkled with references to current posts on the message boards and recently uploaded files.

Notable Version Timeline
v1.00 was the first working version, dated February 1, 1990.

v1.42 was the last major update of the 1.xx versions, released December 14, 1992.

v1.50 was released April 13, 1994 as a maintenance release for systems that were not ready to move to 2.0x.

v2.00 was released March 23, 1994.  It represented a major overhaul which allowed sysops to customize all user-viewable text, allowing multiple languages and display motifs.  Celerity boards entered a phase of heavy customization and art expression.

v2.04 labelled the "Final Release" was released as freeware on May 17, 1996.

v2.05 released multiple beta builds between 8/1/96 and the last release on 12/31/99 adding y2k support.

Bulletin board system software